Barents may refer to:

René Barents (born 1951), Dutch judge and legal scholar
Willem Barents (c. 1550–1597), Dutch navigator and explorer
Barents AirLink, a Swedish airline
Barents Island, an island in the Svalbard archipelago, part of Norway
Barents Sea, a part of the Arctic Ocean north of Norway and Russia
Barents Region, the land along the coast of the Barents Sea
Barents Basin, a sedimentary basin in the Barents Sea
Barents Euro-Arctic Council, the official body for inter-governmental co-operation in the Barents Region

See also
Barentsburg, second largest settlement in the Svalbard archipelago
Barentsjøkulen, a glacier on Barentsøya